Sauvé station is an intermodal transit station in the borough of Ahuntsic-Cartierville in Montreal, Quebec, Canada. The Montreal Metro station is operated by the Société de transport de Montréal (STM) and serves the Orange Line. It is located in the Ahuntsic district. The station opened October 14, 1966, as part of the original network of the Metro.

Just south of the station on Berri Street, is the Canadian National railway line, which carries the Réseau de transport métropolitain's (RTM) Mascouche commuter and Via Rail intercity trains. The Sauvé commuter rail station is connected to these corridors, and replaces the nearby Via Rail Ahuntsic station.

Overview 
The Metro station, designed by Adalbert Niklewicz, is a normal side platform station, built in tunnel. A single mezzanine connects entrances on either side of Sauvé Street.

Origin of the name 
This station is named for Sauvé Street, named in 1912 for a landowner whose property the street crossed.

Commuter and intercity rail 

Sauvé station is a commuter rail station operated by Exo.

It is served by the Mascouche line and by VIA Rail's Montreal–Jonquière and Montreal–Senneterre trains. VIA service was moved to Sauvé from the now-closed Ahuntsic station some 500 metres east of the station (not to be confused with the present-day Ahuntsic commuter train station, to the west).

It is one of five stations in the Exo system with a connection to the Montreal Metro, and is the only such intermodal station besides Gare Centrale/Bonaventure to be served by intercity rail.

Connecting bus routes

Nearby points of interest
 Chevra Kadisha-B'nai Jacob Congregation Cemetery
 Shaare Zion congregation Cemetery
 Henri Julien Park
 Auteuil Park

References

External links
Sauvé Station  - official site
Montreal by Metro, metrodemontreal.com - photos, information, and trivia
 2011 STM System Map
 Metro Map
 Sauve Commuter Train Station Information (RTM)
 Sauve Commuter Train Station Schedule (RTM)
 2016 STM System Map

Orange Line (Montreal Metro)
Railway stations in Canada opened in 1966
Exo commuter rail stations
Ahuntsic-Cartierville
Railway stations in Quebec